The 2014 KPIT MSLTA Challenger was a professional tennis tournament played on hard courts. It was the inaugural edition of the tournament which was part of the 2014 ATP Challenger Tour. It took place at Shree Shiv Chhatrapati Sports Complex in Pune, India from 20 to 25 October 2014.

Singles main-draw entrants

Seeds

 1 Rankings are as of 12 October 2014.

Other entrants
The following players received wildcards into the singles main draw:
  Arjun Kadhe
  Sasikumar Mukund
  Sidharth Rawat 
  Vishnu Vardhan

The following player entered the draw as special exempts:
  Saketh Myneni

The following players received entry from the qualifying draw:
  Riccardo Ghedin 
  Sarvar Ikramov
  Vijay Sundar Prashanth
  Purav Raja

The following player entered the draw as alternate:
  Richard Becker

Champions

Singles

 Yūichi Sugita def.  Adrián Menéndez Maceiras 6–7(1–7), 6–4, 6–4

Doubles

 Saketh Myneni /  Sanam Singh def.  Sanchai Ratiwatana /  Sonchat Ratiwatana 6–3, 6–2

References

External links
Official Website

KPIT MSLTA Challenger
KPIT MSLTA Challenger
KPIT MSLTA Challenger
KPIT MSLTA Challenger